Paul Francis McDermott (born 17 September 1965), who performs as Paul Mac, is an Australian electropop musician, singer-songwriter, producer and music re-mixer. He was classically trained at Sydney Conservatorium of Music. Mac has formed various bands including Smash Mac Mac (1986–88), The Lab (1989–1998), Itch-E and Scratch-E (1991–present), Boo Boo Mace & Nutcase (1996–98), and The Dissociatives (2003–2005). Mac has released two solo albums, 3000 Feet High (6 August 2001) and Panic Room (17 October 2005) – both appeared in the top 40 on the ARIA Albums Chart.

At the ARIA Music Awards of 2002 Mac won 'Best Dance Release' for 3000 Feet High and was nominated for 'Best Male Artist' and 'Engineer of the Year'. In June 2001 he released his highest charting single, "Just the Thing", which featured lead vocals by Peta Morris. It reached No. 17 on the ARIA Singles Chart and at the APRA Music Awards of 2002 it won 'Most Performed Dance Work'.

Mac played with Severed Heads. He was also a touring member of Silverchair as well as recording piano parts for their album, Young Modern (March 2007), having worked with frontman Daniel Johns as The Dissociatives previously. He has provided remixes for Silverchair, Powderfinger, The Mark of Cain, Grinspoon, The Cruel Sea, INXS and Placebo. Mac has worked on soundtracks for Baz Luhrmann and on the films Head On and Sample People. He was the musical director on the Australian TV show, Good News Week, and composed music for ABC-TV including The Afternoon Show, EC Plays Lift Off and TVTV.

Biography
Mac was born on 17 September 1965. He is the youngest of seven children and grew up in a strict Catholic family in Sydney. As a teenager Mac played hymns on the organ at his local church, including for weddings and funerals. He later described himself as "the worst Virgo, ex-Catholic you've ever met". He is a classically trained graduate from Sydney Conservatorium of Music, as a Bachelor of Music Education. In the mid-1980s he was a member of Smash Mac Mac, which were an art noise band covering Talking Heads material – Mac introduced drum machines and electronic elements. In 1987 they issued the album, Chapter One: Light on the Silo. In 1989 Mac formed the synthpop, electronica group The Lab in Sydney with Yolanda Podolski on lead vocals, and Warwick Hornby (aka Warwick Factor) on vocals and bass guitar. The group signed with rooArt, which released their two extended plays, Ultra (1992) and Terminal (1993). They moved to BMG and issued their debut album, Labyrinth, in 1997. The group disbanded the following year.
Smash Mac Mac recorded 1 double sided single packed in a Pizza like box but melted in the Redfern flat above a Fish and Chips Shops and the vynil was unplayable.  The EP was recorded without the duo trombones @ tritones - James Valentine dropped a sax horn in.  Steve minor had a beaut dream like lyric to Paul's rhymic drone - and we didn't rehearse one night as thr SBS had Dr ...'s (cannot bother googling) Cabinet and The Tin Drum on - gr8 night :-)

1991–1997: Itch-E and Scratch-E
In 1991, Mac formed a side-project, Itch-E and Scratch-E, with fellow Sydney-based electronica artist, Andy Rantzen of the group, Pelican Daughters. Both provided keyboards and samplers. Itch-E and Scratch-E became their main focus with the success of their debut album, Itch-E Kitch-E Koo (1993), and its related single, "Sweetness and Light (song)" (1994). At the ARIA Music Awards of 1995 the single won Best Dance Release. During his acceptance speech Mac controversially declared, "We'd like to thank all of Sydney's ecstasy dealers, without whom this award would not be possible". One of the sponsors of the ceremony was the National Drug Offensive, which withdrew their support. In 2005, Mac explained that he did not expect to win and so had not prepared a speech. The group often includes Sherriff Lindo for live performances. From 1996 to 1998, Mac and Rantzen also performed as Boo Boo and Mace!, and with Lindo aboard they worked as Boo Boo Mace 'n' Nutcase.

1997–2000: work with Silverchair, Paul Mac Presents SnapShots and I Can't Believe It's Not Rock
In 1997, Mac remixed the single, "Freak", from Australian post-grunge band Silverchair's second album, Freak Show. The track was issued in April as a B-side of their second single from that album, "Abuse Me".

In 1998, Mac released a four-track EP, Paul Mac Presents Snapshots, on Interdance Records. It featured guest vocals by Stephen Allkins on "Ooh I Love Your (Disco)", Infusion on "Loco", Phil Smart on "Basic Boom" and Abel El Toro on "All Systems Are Go". Mac again worked with Silverchair's Daniel Johns as an alternative rock duo to release a five-track extended play, I Can't Believe It's Not Rock (2000).

2001–2005: 3000 Feet High, The Dissociatives and Panic Room
On 6 August 2001, Mac issued his debut solo album, 3000 Feet High, which peaked in the top 30 on the ARIA Albums Chart. Australian music journalist, Ed Nimmervoll, felt the album was an "emotional journey" where "[t]hroughout, the dancefloor taunts us like a temptress, determined to lure us into her arms, but we're torn between her charms and the inner us which the dance beats may drown out". The album's second single, "Just the Thing", reached No. 17 on the ARIA Singles Chart and featured lead vocals by Peta Morris. In December 2001 he performed at Homebake on the Big Top stage. At the APRA Music Awards of 2002 "Just the Thing" won 'Most Performed Dance Work' and was nominated for 'Most Performed Australian Work'. In January 2002, and again in 2006, Mac appeared at Splendour in the Grass. At the ARIA Music Awards of 2002 Mac won 'Best Dance Release' for 3000 Feet High and was nominated for 'Best Male Artist' and 'Engineer of the Year'.

Mac and Johns co-wrote the music for Love Is a Four Letter Word (2001) episode 13, "Split". 
In mid-2003, the Mac and Johns formed another alternative rock group, The Dissociatives, which issued their debut album of the same name in April 2004. Their first live show was in Hobart in June of that year. Mac explained his motivation, "As music narrows out into increasingly smaller genres, it's important to bring the fun of making music back into play. Not following any predetermined rules and making the most honest beautiful music we could is fun". At the ARIA Music Awards of 2004 Mac and Johns were nominated for 'Producer of the Year' for the album.

Mac's second album, Panic Room, appeared on 17 October 2005, and reached the top 40. Johns had advised Mac to "follow your dreams regardless of what outside fashion is saying you should be doing". Vocals are variously supplied by Morris, Sarah McLeod, Luke Steele, Abby Dobson (ex-Leonardo's Bride), Lenka, and Ngaiire. Mac explained seeing Joseph, on TV in August 2004, "I was watching the episode of [Australian Idol] when she got kicked out and I thought 'who is this girl, she is fantastic'... I tracked her down and gave her a call. It turned out great. I am just really happy with the whole album". For Silverchair's 2007 album, Young Modern, Mac supplied piano and toured with the group providing keyboards and piano on stage.

2008–2014: soundtracks, remixes and touring
In 2008, Mac provided the music for a one-man comedy play, Possessed, performed by Frank Woodley. In March that year, he supplied the theme song, "The Only One" for the feature film, Hey, Hey, It's Esther Blueburger, with three versions on the soundtrack: one had vocals by Bertie Blackman, another by Sydney Children's Choir and one was an instrumental. He formed a production duo, Stereogamous, with Jonny Seymour (aka DJ Seymour Butz), in 2010 they worked on LCD Soundsystem's single, "I Can Change", from their album, This Is Happening. They have also remixed "Cupid Boy" for Kylie Minogue and "Bring Night" for Sia. In 2011 they worked on George Michael's track, "Every Other Lover in the World". Mac co-wrote "I Don't Care What You Say" with its performer Anthony Callea and Cindy Ryan (of Stella One Eleven); it was released in February 2012 by Callea on his seven-track EP, Last to Go, which was co-produced by Mac. On 6 September, the feature film, Kath & Kimderella, premiered with Mac's musical score. He also has a cameo in the final scene.

2015–present: Holiday From Me and Mesmerism
On 22 January 2015, Mac announced the forthcoming release of his third studio album, titled Holiday From Me. It will feature Megan Washington, Brendan Maclean, Dave Mason and Nathan Hudson on vocals.

In February 2019, Mac released a new single titled "Cataplexy" and confirmed a new album is coming soon. In April, Mac confirmed the album is titled Mesmerism and will be released on 3 May 2019.

Academic career
Decades after completing his earlier music degree, Mac returned to his alma mater, Sydney Conservatorium of Music, for postgraduate study. In 2021, he graduated with a Doctor of Musical Arts qualification in composition, based on fusing electronic dance music traditions with experimental practice. As at 2022, he holds an academic staff role at the Conservatorium, teaching Contemporary Music Practice courses within its Bachelor of Music programme.

Personal life
In October 2004, Mac was living in Erskineville. Mac is openly gay; in 2007, he reminisced about his first attendance at Sydney's Mardi Gras in the 1980s: "I can't remember who the act even was – it was a long time ago ... I wasn't really out – actually, I wasn't out at all. I just ended up at the party and I remember realising that there was this whole world out there that I felt really proud to be a part of. There was such a sense of wonder".

Discography

Studio albums

Extended plays

Singles

Production work and other credits
 1994 "Dead Eyes Opened (Love Experiment)", (remix) Dead Eyes Opened Remix Severed Heads
 1996 "The Contender", "The Contender (reprise)" (remixes) Rock and Roll The Mark of Cain
 1999 "Anthem for the Year 2000", "Spawn Again", "Satin Sheets" (keyboards) Neon Ballroom Silverchair
 2000 I Can't Believe It's Not Rock (with Daniel Johns)
 2002 "Across the Night", "World Upon Your Shoulders", "Tuna in the Brine", "Too Much of Not Enough", "Luv Your Life", "My Favourite Thing" (piano) Diorama Silverchair
 2002 "Symphony of Life" (extended euroremix) Tina Arena
 2004 "Pictures of You" (remix) One Perfect Day after The Cure's 1989 album Disintegration
 2004 "She" (producer) Stella One Eleven Stella One Eleven
 2005 (co-producer) Counting Down the Days Natalie Imbruglia
 2005 "Mini Morris Parts 1 and 2" (performer with Cezary Skubiszewski) Hating Alison Ashley Various Artists

Awards

ARIA Awards
PaulMac has won one award from seven ARIA Music Awards nominations.

|-
| rowspan="2"| 2001
| rowspan="2"| "Just the Thing"
| Best Dance Release
| 
|-
| Best Male Artist
| 
|-
| rowspan="3"| 2001
| rowspan="3"| 3000 Feet High
| Best Dance Release
| 
|-
| Best Male Artist
| 
|-
| Engineer of the Year
| 
|-
| rowspan="1"| 2004
| rowspan="1"| PaulMac with Daniel Johns for The Dissociatives
| Producer of the Year
| 
|-
| rowspan="1"| 2006
| rowspan="1"| "Panic Room"
| Best Dance Release
|

APRA Awards
The APRA Awards are held in Australia and New Zealand by the Australasian Performing Right Association to recognise songwriting skills, sales and airplay performance by its members annually. PaulMac has won one award from four nominations.

|-
| rowspan="3"| 2002
| rowspan="2"|  "Just the Thing"
| APRA Award for Most Performed Australian Work
| 
|-
| rowspan="2"|  APRA Award for Most Performed Dance Work
| 
|-
| rowspan="1"|  "The Sound of Breaking Up"
| 
|-
| rowspan="1"| 2006
| rowspan="1"|  "Sunshine Eyes"
| APRA Award for Most Performed Dance Work
| 
|-

References

General
  Note: Archived [on-line] copy has limited functionality.
Specific

External links 
 

1965 births
Living people
APRA Award winners
ARIA Award winners
Australian gay musicians
Musicians from Sydney
Australian LGBT singers
Australian LGBT songwriters
Gay songwriters
Gay singers
20th-century LGBT people
21st-century LGBT people
The Dissociatives members